Sono Lo Scherno is the fourth studio album by black metal band Krieg. It was recorded in 1998. Zerstorungs Productions released a vinyl version with a bonus track, "Purteance", limited to 999 copies.

Track listing

2005 albums
Krieg (band) albums